Grupo ACIR is a Mexican media company specializing in the operation of radio stations. It was established in 1965. ACIR is an acronym for Asociación de Concesionarios Independientes de Radio (Association of Independent Radio Concessionaires).

History

Grupo ACIR was founded on June 8, 1965, when Francisco Ibarra bought the XEDQ-AM (Radio Alegría) station in San Andrés Tuxtla, Veracruz.

During the next two years, three new radio stations were integrated: XEOM-AM in Coatzacoalcos, Veracruz, XEMM-AM in Morelia, Michoacán, XEMIA-AM in Guadalajara, Jalisco; and three stations of amplitude modulation in the Mexico City: XEL-AM Radio Capital, XEFR-AM Radio Felicidad and XEVOZ-AM Radio Voz.

In 1966, the group had 22 radio broadcasters, among its own, managed and affiliated.  The distinctive feature of Grupo ACIR compared to its competitors was to provide a comprehensive sales, programming, engineering and legal advice service in all its stations.

In 1970, one more station joined the group: XHSH-FM 95.3 MHz, Radio Amistad, from Mexico City.

It is in 1976 when Grupo ACIR Nacional is created, an organization destined to manage and market the group's stations throughout the country.

With the arrival of new technologies, in 1983, the Radio Capital station located in Mexico City, became the first to play music with compact discs (CDs) on the air.

In 1984 it became the first radio group to have 140 radio stations, with the purchase of seven stations in the cities of Delicias (Chihuahua), Puebla, Puerto Vallarta (Jalisco) and Villahermosa (Tabasco).

In 1985, the news agency Radio Comunicación Humana, the forerunner of ACIR Noticias, began operations.

It is from 1986 when ACIR SAT is founded, the first system of radiophonic links via satellite.

In 1987, the Puebla company Grupo HR, made up of the stations XEHR-AM, XEPOP-AM, XHVC-FM, XHRC-FM, XHRH-FM and XHJE-FM 94.1 MHz, joined Grupo ACIR.

On January 11, 1988, the program Espacio Deportivo, the first radio sports magazine, began broadcasting. The following year the newscast Panorama Informativo began broadcasting simultaneously on XEL-AM and XHSH-FM, becoming the first combo of a newscast on Mexican radio and the first long-term newscast, which was broadcast from 7:00 to 11:00 nationwide to more than 70 stations in the main cities of the country. In that same year, four stations from cities such as Cancun (Quintana Roo), Mérida and Valladolid entered the group.

With the turn of the decade, Grupo ACIR pioneered the use of mobile transmission units.

In 1992, LP records were used for the last time at Grupo ACIR stations and the distribution of compact discs began.

In the 90s, Grupo ACIR complemented Panorama Informativo with other news systems that placed it in a unique place in terms of audience and national presence. Vector XXI hosted by José Cárdenas.  Acir Radio Noticias, a total information system, with Ana Patricia Candiani and Jesús Martín Mendoza Arriola. Likewise, Efrén Flores highlighted with Investing in Mexico, the first program specialized in economics and finance on Mexican radio.

At the beginning of 1995 the group was made up of three stations of the ARTSA company licensed in the Mexico City: XHM-FM 88.9 MHz, Azul 89; XHPOP-FM 99.3 MHz, Digital 99; and XHDFM-FM 106.5 MHz, Amor 106.

In 1999, other stations were incorporated in Pachuca, Toluca and Puebla. In the latter site, despite the existence of Grupo ACIR Puebla, it lacked representation by Grupo ACIR.  Thus, the latter partnered with Corporación Puebla de Radiodifusión for the operation of its brands.

2003 was a year of renewal for Grupo ACIR, since they integrate the most advanced audio systems in terms of broadcasting technology into their operation, that same year two new concepts go on the air:, 88.9 Noticias in 88.9 MHz and La 1260 in 1260 kHz; the first focused on information, the second aimed at the female audience.

In 2004, Grupo ACIR created the Radio Tráfico Total concept, reporting on road and traffic matters every 15 minutes. Simultaneously, the roads in Mexico City, Querétaro and Monterrey are reported, as well as Atlanta and San Diego, in the United States of America.

Also in 2004, Grupo ACIR, organized a massive concert in the Mexico City: El Megaconcierto, breaking attendance records by bringing together more than 120,000 spectators in the Zócalo of Mexico City in its first two editions, on April 17 and October 24 and 145,000 more in the editions of 2005, April 16 and October 20. For 2006, on May 7, it achieves another record number: 155,000 attendees.

In 2005 the station XEPO-AM 1100 kHz, Inolvidable 1100 AM, was disincorporated in San Luis Potosí. Said station is acquired by the Controladora de Medios group to convert it into a Imagen Radio repeater. In this square it keeps the stations XHNB-FM 95.3 MHz; XHQK-FM 98.5 MHz and XHTL-FM 99.3 MHz.

In Puebla, on June 1, 2007, Grupo ACIR Puebla disappeared and became Cinco Radio, thus creating an autonomous consortium directed solely by the Cañedo Castillo family. At the same time, Corporación Puebla de Radiodifusión has since been called «Grupo ACIR».

As part of its strategy, in 2009 the following stations were disincorporated.

 XHRST-FM from Tijuana, Baja California.
 XEZAR-AM from Puebla de Zaragoza, Puebla.
 XEACA-AM from Acapulco, Guerrero.
 The Sonoran companies XHCNE-FM, XHLDC-FM, XHPPO-FM, XHRCL-FM from Cananea, Magdalena de Kino, Puerto Peñasco and San Luis Río Colorado, respectively. XEEB-AM and XEIQ-AM from Ciudad Obregón.
 XEPJ-AM from Guadalajara, Jalisco.
 XEVOZ-AM from Mexico City
 XEQY-AM from Toluca, State of Mexico

In 2011 Grupo ACIR opened stations in Zacatecas, since it formed an alliance with Grupo Radiofónico ZER and in 2017 the alliance between Grupo Radiofónico ZER and Grupo ACIR ended.

In 2013, important changes occurred at Grupo ACIR stations. In the month of July, the XHM-FM station begins to broadcast romantic music in Spanish, changing its format to Siempre 88.9, although it still continues to broadcast several informative programs, later, the XHDFM-FM and XEFR-AM stations change their image and make light modifications to their musical repertoires, however they do not change the format, that is, they continue as Mix 106.5 FM and Radio Felicidad 1180 AM, XHPOP-FM changes its concept to Radio Disney 99.3 although maintaining the current pop and youth music format. XHSH-FM and XEL-AM, remain as Amor and La 1260 respectively, without undergoing any changes.

In 2014 the expansion of Radio Disney begins.

In 2015, the La 1260 format disappeared in XEL-AM and was replaced by La Comadre.

In 2018 the format 88.9 Noticias returns, replacing Siempre 88.9, maintaining the same programming. In April of the same year, it went from XEMIA-AM 850 to XHEMIA-FM 90.3 in the city of Guadalajara, Jalisco and in June, it went from XEOK-AM 900 to XHOK-FM 90.9 in the city of Monterrey, Nuevo León, contemplating involving Radio Disney within the state stations.

On December 24, 2019, ACIR terminates the alliance with The Walt Disney Company México, disappearing the concept of Radio Disney México. In substitution on December 25, Match FM appears, becoming official on January 7, 2020 at noon.

On July 31, 2021, ACIR transferred the XEL-AM operation to the Catholic radio station ESNE Radio, so the La Comadre format ceased to be heard in Mexico City.

Grupo ACIR coverage
The following tables show the coverage of the main commercial brands of Grupo ACIR in Mexico.

Amor

Mix

La Comadre

Match

Noticias

Radio Felicidad

References

External links

 
Mass media companies of Mexico
Mexican radio networks
Mexican companies established in 1965
Mass media companies established in 1965